The Bishop of Cork and Cloyne was an episcopal title which took its name after the city of Cork and the town of Cloyne in southern Ireland.

History
The see was formed by the union of the bishoprics of Cork and Cloyne in 1429. Following the Reformation, there were parallel apostolic successions: one of the Church of Ireland and the other of the Roman Catholic Church.

Pre-Reformation bishops

Post-Reformation bishops

Church of Ireland succession

Roman Catholic succession

Notes
 Dominic Tirrey  and Roger Skiddy  were bishops of both successions.

References

Cork and Cloyne
Cork and Cloyne
Religion in County Cork